Filip Stanić (born 14 January 1998) is a German professional basketball player for S.Oliver Würzburg of the Basketball Bundesliga.

Professional career 
In July 2018, Stanić signed a multi-year contract for the Mega Bemax of the Basketball League of Serbia. In April 2019, he was loaned to OKK Beograd.

In July 2020, Stanić signed with Niners Chemnitz, newcomers in the Basketball Bundesliga. He played only 13 games for Chemnitz in 2020-21 and was considerably slowed down by injuries. Stanić signed a contract with fellow Bundesliga outfit S.Oliver Würzburg in May 2021.

National team career 
Stanić was a member of the Germany national under-20 basketball team that won the bronze medal at the 2018 FIBA Europe Under-20 Championship. Over seven tournament games, he averaged 13.6 points, 7.1 rebounds and 1.3 assists per game. At the tournament's end, he got selected to All-Tournament Team.

References

External links 
 Player Profile at ABA League
 Player Profile at eurobasket.com

1998 births
Living people
ABA League players
Alba Berlin players
Basketball League of Serbia players
Basketball players from Berlin
Centers (basketball)
EWE Baskets Oldenburg players
German expatriate basketball people in Serbia
German men's basketball players
German people of Yugoslav descent
KK Mega Basket players
NINERS Chemnitz players
OKK Beograd players
Power forwards (basketball)
Rockets (basketball club) players
S.Oliver Würzburg players